Miguel Alejo Vicente (born 1950) is a Spanish politician and civil servant. He is a member of the Spanish Socialist Workers' Party. He is the current Mayor of Almeida de Sayago since 2015. He was a councilor of the León from 1995 to 2003. He was a delegate of the government in Castile and León.

Biography
Miguel Alejo was born in Almeida de Sayago, Spain in 1950. He studied at the University of Salamanca and received a Degree in Romance Philology.

References 

1950 births
Living people
20th-century Spanish politicians
21st-century Spanish politicians
Spanish Socialist Workers' Party politicians
University of Salamanca alumni